Turf Lea is a hamlet located at the end of The Ridge, above Marple, in the Metropolitan Borough of Stockport, Greater Manchester, UK.

Nearby is Wybersley Hall, where the author Christopher Isherwood was born.

References

External links

 UK & Ireland Genealogy - reference to Turf Lea and its environs

Villages in Greater Manchester
Towns and villages of the Peak District
Geography of the Metropolitan Borough of Stockport